William J. Winchester (c. 1876-1952) was a city councilor and state legislator in Delaware. He served from 1948 until 1952 and was the first African American in the Delaware House of Representatives. A historical marker Wilmington, Delaware commemorates him and other of the state's pioneering African American legislators.

Life before politics
William J. Winchester was born in Barclay, Maryland around 1876. In 1888, he moved to Wilmington, Delaware.

He married a woman named Alverta. They had one child, vibraphonist Lem Winchester. Winchester served as grand master of a local Odd Fellows lodge.

Political career and life
He was a Republican. Winchester served on the Wilmington City Council for sixteen years, leaving the council in 1941.

He ran for the Delaware House of Representatives in 1944 and was defeated. He was elected in 1948, making him the first Black man elected to the Delaware House of Representatives. He was re-elected in 1950.

While serving in the house, Winchester worked as superintendent for Wilmington's garbage collection. In June 1949, Winchester was awarded an honorary doctor of law from Delaware State College.

Death
Winchester became sick in late 1951, missing numerous legislative sessions. He died of cerebral thrombosis at his house in Wilmington on January 3, 1952, while serving his second term in office.

At the time of his death, he was a member of the Odd Fellows and Elks. He was also a trustee and the treasurer of Mount Joy Methodist Church and a trustee of Morgan State University.

Legacy
In 1979, a bridge in Wilmington over the Christina River at Third Street was named in his honor.

See also
List of African-American officeholders (1900–1959)

References

1870s births
1952 deaths
Year of birth uncertain
Republican Party members of the Delaware House of Representatives
People from Queen Anne's County, Maryland
Delaware city council members
New Castle County, Delaware politicians
Members of the Odd Fellows
African-American men in politics
Members of the Benevolent and Protective Order of Elks
African-American state legislators in Delaware
20th-century African-American politicians
20th-century American politicians